The Q38 is a bus route in Queens, New York City. The route travels from the Corona and Elmhurst neighborhoods to the Forest Hills neighborhood, running in a "C" shape via the Metropolitan Avenue station in Middle Village. It runs seven days a week but does not operate overnight. Formerly privately operated by Triboro Coach Corporation, the route is now city-operated under the MTA Bus Company brand of MTA Regional Bus Operations.

The Q38 was founded as two separate routes. The Penelope Avenue route was originally started by the Affiliated Bus Transit Corporation on June 17, 1934, as the Q38, which ran from East Elmhurst to the Metropolitan Avenue station. The Eliot Avenue portion was later split into its own route, the Q45X (later the Q50). The East Elmhurst branch of the old Q38 was truncated to Forest Hills by 1948. On July 3, 1960, the Penelope and Eliot Avenue routes were combined into the current loop service, with the Q38 designation retained for the entire route.

Route
Both the Eliot Avenue and the Penelope Avenue sections run one to two blocks away from the Juniper Valley Park, on opposite sides of the park. The two sections also run along the northern and southern edges of the Lutheran All Faiths Cemetery, respectively. The Q38 route's buses are maintained at College Point Depot, with the route using New Flyer C40LF compressed natural gas buses dispatched from the depot. The route's buses were previously based out of LaGuardia Depot, the former Triboro Coach depot, until 2010.

Corona-bound
Going "northbound" towards Corona (or southbound towards Middle Village from Forest Hills), the Q38 starts at 108th Street and 62nd Drive in Forest Hills, and travels west down 62nd Drive all the way until Queens Boulevard. Then it turns left onto Queens Boulevard for a block down and then turns right on 63rd Drive. Here, the route serves the 63rd Drive–Rego Park station of the IND Queens Boulevard Line and the Rego Center shopping complex. The route proceeds west along 63rd Drive past Woodhaven Boulevard, where 63rd Drive turns into Penelope Avenue, until 77th Place. Juniper Valley Park sits one block to the north at this location. The Q38 then travels in a zigzag pattern in which it turns left (south) onto 77th Place for a block, then right (west) on Furmanville Avenue, then left on 75th Place, then right on Juniper Valley Road, left on 69th Street, then right onto Metropolitan Avenue. Traveling west along Metropolitan, the route stops at the Middle Village–Metropolitan Avenue station of the BMT Myrtle Avenue Line, and the Metro Mall shopping center.

The Q38 continues west to Fresh Pond Road, in Ridgewood where it then turns north and then east onto Eliot Avenue, and back into Middle Village again. The Q38 continues down Eliot Avenue until Woodhaven Boulevard, then turns north a short distance on Woodhaven until Queens Boulevard. Here, the route serves the Queens Center Mall and the Woodhaven Boulevard station of the IND Queens Boulevard Line. The route continues east along 59th Avenue, then north on Junction Boulevard, east on 57th Avenue (passing LeFrak City), north on 98th Street, east on Christie Avenue, south on 99th Street, and east on 60th Avenue, before making a sharp right to its terminus at Otis Avenue and Horace Harding Expressway in Corona.

Forest Hills-bound

Going towards Forest Hills from Corona, the Q38 originates at Otis Avenue and the Horace Harding Expressway, then makes a right on 99th Street, turns left on Christie Avenue, left on 98th Street, right on 57th Avenue, and left on Hoffman Drive to reach Woodhaven Boulevard. At Hoffman Drive and Queens Boulevard, it interchanges with the Woodhaven Boulevard station, and the  bus routes. The Q38 then turns right onto Woodhaven Boulevard, left onto Eliot Avenue to Middle Village, right onto Fresh Pond Road in Ridgewood, left onto Metropolitan Avenue, and back into Middle Village again, and then reaches the Metropolitan Avenue station.

From there, it continues on Metropolitan Avenue, turns left at 69th Street, then begins the zigzag route via 69th Street, Juniper Valley Road, 75th Place, Furmanville Avenue, and 78th Street before turning east onto Penelope Avenue, which turns into 63rd Drive. At Queens Boulevard, 63rd Drive changes names again and becomes 63rd Road. The Q38 utilizes 63rd Road until 110th Street, then makes a left on 62nd Drive, terminating at 108th Street.

History

The current Q38 is a combination of several services which ran under Triboro Coach. The Penelope Avenue route was originally started by the Affiliated Bus Transit Corporation on June 17, 1934, given the designation "Q-38" by the fall of that year. The original Q38 route began in East Elmhurst near Flushing Bay, running south down 108th Street, west on 62nd Drive and Apex Place. It then followed the current Q38 route through Rego Park, Forest Hills and Middle Village via 63rd Drive, Penelope Avenue, and the "zig-zag" pattern ending at the Metropolitan Avenue station. Later in 1934, the northern terminus was moved south to Corona at the 111th Street station of the IRT Flushing Line, running south along 111th Street and short portions of Corona Avenue and Colonial Avenue. It then followed 62nd Drive, Apex Place, and the current Q38 route to the Metropolitan Avenue station. Affiliated Bus operated the route on several temporary permits, before being granted a five-year contract from the city in November 1934. The route was acquired in 1936 by Triboro Coach Corporation, as part of the company's takeover of all routes within "Zone A" of Queens' four-zone bus system, covering greater Woodside. Affiliated Bus was not compensated for the takeover, as their equipment was considered obsolete. At the time, the roads along the route were much rougher and more difficult to traverse than in other parts of Queens; furthermore, the route received spotty service via Triboro Coach's oldest buses since it was deemed unprofitable. By 1948, the Corona portion of the Q38 was eliminated, and it was truncated to its current Forest Hills terminus at 108th Street.

The Eliot Avenue portion of the line was a separate Triboro Coach route. Buses would run from Jackson Heights at the Victor Moore Bus Terminal to around Eliot Avenue and 80th Street, before turning southwest towards 69th Street at the Lutheran All Faiths Cemetery. An alternate routing turning north on Eliot towards Woodhaven Boulevard never operated. The service was referred to as the "Q45 Extension". The spurs later became a distinct route called the Q45X (short for "Q45 Extension") or the Q45 Eliot Avenue Line, running on Eliot Avenue from Woodhaven Boulevard south to 69th Street. By 1946, the route was renamed the Q50 (distinct from the current  between Flushing and the Bronx). Around 1948 the route was extended north past Queens Boulevard to Corona in modern LeFrak City, and south to 60th Place and 62nd Avenue near Metropolitan Avenue.

On July 3, 1960, the Penelope and Eliot Avenue routes were combined into the current loop service, with the Q38 designation retained for the entire route. Before 1975, the Corona end of the route was extended east to its current terminus at Otis Avenue.

On February 2, 2006, Triboro Coach ceased operations and the Q38, as well as all other routes operating under Triboro Coach, were picked up by the Metropolitan Transportation Authority (MTA). Fare structures were converted to those of the MTA. The former Triboro Coach depot in East Elmhurst became the LaGuardia Depot under MTA Bus. 

In December 2019, the MTA released a draft redesign of the Queens bus network. As part of the redesign, many parts of the Q38's route would have been discontinued. The Eliot Avenue section would have been replaced with the QT77, a "neighborhood" route running from Elmhurst to Long Island City, while the Penelope Avenue/63rd Drive section would have become the QT82, running from Glendale to East Elmhurst. The redesign was delayed due to the COVID-19 pandemic in New York City in 2020, and the original draft plan was dropped due to negative feedback. A revised plan was released in March 2022. The Eliot Avenue/Corona branch of the Q38 would be split into a new route, the Q14, running from the Fresh Pond Road station in Ridgewood to Ditmars Boulevard in East Elmhurst. The Q14 would also take over part of the Q23 in Corona. The Q38 designation would still apply to the Rego Park branch, which would terminate at Metropolitan Avenue and Fresh Pond Road. In Middle Village, the Q38 would be straightened, running along Juniper Boulevard South from 69th Street to Dry Harbor Road.

References

External links

 

Q038
038